Food Basics Ltd. is a Canadian supermarket chain owned by Metro Inc. The company operates over 130 stores throughout Ontario.

History
Food Basics was created by A&P Canada to compete with the successful No Frills warehouse-style supermarket operated by Loblaw Companies. It became part of the Metro group when A&P Canada was sold to Metro  for $1.7 billion in 2005.

Food Basics lowers its prices in a number of ways: low maintenance (no free plastic bags, just free cardboard boxes), store decor is kept to a minimum, and fewer staff are employed, mostly in part-time positions. The chain operates by pushing higher volumes on a limited selection of products than Metro stores, allowing it to compete price-wise with other grocery stores. There were 117 locations in Ontario. 36 were franchise stores until Metro Inc. purchased all stores back by the end of 2008.

Some Food Basics feature a pharmacy known as Food Basics Pharmacy.

Some locations are former Super Fresh or A&P supermarkets, dating from when both chains were operated by A&P, or other former banners such as A&P-owned Dominion or Metro-owned Super C.

In the past, the owners' names appeared on the banner (e.g., 'John/Jane's Food Basics'); however, all stores are now simply called 'Food Basics'. Concurrent with this change is a different slogan, which was changed from "Best Prices Everyday!!!" to "Always more for less!"

In Fall 2006, Metro Inc. began to renovate Food Basics stores. The design and format of these new stores closely resemble Metro's Super C banner in Quebec. New store signs feature broken lettering and a larger emphasis on yellow, green, and beige colours. In Spring 2007, Metro Inc. initiated their new inventory system into all of its warehouses.

Labour relations

Food Basics is represented by the United Food and Commercial Workers union. Food Basics mostly offers part-time positions, and each store has few full-time positions. In 2015, overnight positions were discontinued by most stores because of budget reasons.

Locations

140 locations in Ontario:

 Ajax (2)
 Ancaster
 Barrie
 Belleville
 Blenheim
 Bolton
 Bracebridge
 Bradford
 Brampton (4)
 Brantford (2)
 Brockville
 Burlington (3)
 Caledonia 
 Cambridge (2)
 Chatham
 Chelmsford
 Cornwall (2)
 Courtice
 Dunnville
 Elmira
 Fonthill
 Georgetown
 Goderich
 Grimsby
 Guelph (3)
 Hamilton (6)
 Hanmer
 Hanover
 Kemptville
 Keswick
 Kingston (4)
 Kitchener (4)
 Leamington
 Lindsay
 Listowel
 London (5)
 Markham 
 Midland
 Milton
 Mississauga (6)
 New Liskeard
 Newmarket
 Niagara Falls (2) 
 North Bay
 North York (2)
 Oakville (2)
 Orillia
 Oshawa
 Ottawa (8)
 Owen Sound
 Pembroke
 Pickering
 Port Colborne
 Port Elgin (coming soon)
 Port Hope
 Port Perry
 Richmond Hill (2)
 Rockland
 Sarnia 
 Sault Ste. Marie (2)
 Simcoe
 Smiths Falls
 St. Catharines (2)
 St. Thomas
 Stratford
 Strathroy
 Sudbury (3)
 Tecumseh
 Timmins
 Thornhill (3)
 Toronto (14)
 Waterloo
 Welland
 Windsor (3)
 Woodbridge
 Woodstock

Private label brands
Food Basics carries many products from Metro's private label brands:
 "Irresistibles": premium quality products
 "Selection": regular store-brand products
 "Personnelle": pharmacy, health, and personal care products

Previous private label brands
 "Master Choice": premium quality products.
 "Equality": regular store-brand products.
 "Basics for Less": large economy-sized products. 
 "The Baker's Oven": bakery products
"Great Basics Finds": ready-to-assemble furniture, clothing, housewares and other seasonal items that are specially priced, available in limited quantities, for a limited time
"Simply 1-2-3": low-price health and beauty products
 "Simply Kids": baby products including diapers, baby food and other baby products

See also
List of supermarket chains in Canada
Food Basics (USA) - The now unrelated US-based no-frills supermarket chain currently controlled by A&P

References

Sources
Zwiebach, Elliot. "A&P Canada is forming franchise unit." Supermarket News. November 27, 1995

External links

Official website
Metro Inc.

1995 establishments in Ontario
Companies based in Toronto
Metro Inc.
Discount stores of Canada
Retail companies established in 1995
Supermarkets of Canada
The Great Atlantic & Pacific Tea Company
Canadian companies established in 1995